The murder of Daniel Pełka, aged 4, occurred on 3 March 2012 in Coventry, England, United Kingdom. His mother, Magdalena Łuczak (27), and her partner, Mariusz Krężołek (33), were found guilty of the murder on 31 July 2013. Daniel's death made headlines for months, as it was evident that a number of opportunities had been missed to identify him as suffering severe child abuse. On 2 August 2013, both Łuczak and Krężołek were jailed for life with a minimum sentence of 30 years each. However, both perpetrators died in prison within three years of being sentenced, with Łuczak committing suicide, and Krężołek dying from a heart attack.

Family history
Eryk Pełka, Daniel's biological father, took his family, and his partner Magdalena Łuczak and her child, to the United Kingdom from their native Poland at the end of 2005. Daniel was born in Coventry, England, on 15 July 2007. Eryk remained with the family until the end of 2008. In 2010, Mariusz Krężołek moved in with Łuczak. He was residing in the household at the time of Daniel's death.

Prior evidence of abuse
In 2010, a health visitor noticed a bruise to the side of Daniel's head, but was told he had sustained the bruise from falling over. The following January, he was taken to A&E with a broken arm, and was also seen to have multiple bruises. This was assessed by social services, however, the doctor who saw Daniel claimed that the fracture could have been caused by an accident. In November of the same year, Daniel's school became concerned about his stealing food from other pupils, and eating an unusual amount of the free fruit available. Łuczak had previously told medical professionals that Daniel would raid the fridge at night, and would punch his stepfather when he wasn't given food. A social worker had recommended that Daniel be given a snack on the way to school. By the end of 2011, his school attendance was only 63%. Despite this low rate of school attendance, between November 2011 and February 2012, various injuries to Daniel's head and neck were noted on five separate occasions by three different adults. None of these instances was reported to the police or social services.  

By the start of 2012, the school was raising concerns that Daniel was obsessed with food, and was eating out of garbage bins. On one occasion, he ate half of a teacher's birthday cake which was intended for the whole class. After the school holidays, Daniel showed visible signs of weight loss. One teacher saw fingerprint bruising around Daniel's neck, and staff had also noticed multiple facial bruises. On 10 February 2012, he was seen by Dr. Chakraborthy after having lost weight. The doctor issued a prescription for worms, and said he appeared thin, but not wasting away. On 28 February, Daniel was observed as being "pasty" with "sunken eyes", and not interacting with other children. People continued to notice his eating out of bins, including on 1 March, the day he would receive the beating that caused his death.

In addition to direct concerns about Daniel, social services had been visiting the family since 2008, due to serious domestic violence against Łuczak by Krężołek. However, she said she could protect her children, and Daniel was never interviewed directly.

Death
Daniel died on 3 March 2012. Two days earlier, as a punishment for wetting himself, the child had been beaten severely. Łuczak did a Google search for "care – patient in a coma" as well as salt poisoning on the morning of 2 March. Krężołek dissuaded Łuczak from calling an ambulance, stating that Daniel would "get over it", and that calling for help would "cause proper problems." At 03:07 GMT on the morning of 3 March, a 999 call was made in which Łuczak stated that her son was not breathing. Paramedics arrived and took him to hospital, where he was pronounced dead at 03.50.

The autopsy revealed 22 different injuries, ten of which were to the head. A diagram detailing these injuries was released by West Midlands Police and shown widely in the media. The cause of death was ruled to be a brain injury. Daniel was also severely underweight, weighing just . He was noted as emaciated by hospital staff, and by a child protection specialist shortly after his death. Witnesses described him as looking like "a concentration camp victim", and "a seriously ill cancer patient".

After the investigation, Daniel's body was returned to his father, Eryk Pełka. Initially, Eryk could not afford the cost of flying the body over to Poland from the UK. However, a Polish funeral firm in London donated the money for the cause. On 3 September 2013, Daniel's body was finally buried.

Murder trial
Both Krężołek and Łuczak denied causing Daniel's death, but admitted to the offence of child cruelty.

During the court trial, Łuczak claimed that Krężołek would attempt to strangle her if she tried to protect Daniel, and that he would not let her feed him. One of Daniel's siblings gave evidence that Krężołek had tried to drown Daniel in a bath of cold water, and that he was locked in a room and forbidden to use the toilet. Text message evidence showed Łuczak admitting to nearly drowning Daniel, and that they removed the handle to his bedroom door, so that his siblings could not let him out. The jury also heard that he was force-fed salt, and made to perform squats as a punishment.

The judge's closing remarks described the cruelty to Daniel as "truly horrific", and his starvation as "unprecedented in this country". She also stated that the culprits "carried out a deliberate and cynical deception of teaching, welfare, and medical personnel, which was designed to conceal what was happening, to prevent any help being provided for Daniel".

Legacy
Daniel's murder, as well as the missed opportunities to prevent it generated a "huge sense of public outrage". Members of the public donated over £10,000 to the NSPCC in the boy's memory. Coventry has hosted many gatherings to remember Daniel, with the most recent one held on the six year anniversary of his death.

The case inspired a petition to make it mandatory to report evidence of child abuse. After extensive consultation, the UK government decided not to introduce mandatory reporting, fearing it could create a "needle in a haystack" situation, where reports of extensive evidence of serious abuse would be lost among less credible or less serious reports that had been made, due to fear of legal repercussion. They also noted that countries with mandatory reporting laws did not have a higher rate of child abuse reports.

In 2014, the indie rock band Little Comets released a song called "Salt", accompanied by a YouTube video, dedicated to the memory of Daniel Pełka.

Death of perpetrators
On 14 July 2015, Łuczak was found unresponsive in her cell at HM Prison Foston Hall at about 07:15 BST and was pronounced dead. An inquest held three days later revealed that Łuczak had hanged herself the day before what would have been Daniel's eighth birthday.

At about 08:30 on 27 January 2016, Krężołek was found dead in his prison cell at HM Prison Full Sutton. The cause of death was found to be a heart attack. He had refused medical attention due to fear that people would recognise him.

See also
 Killing of Baby P
 Murder of Zachary Turner
 Murder of Maria Colwell
 Murder of Victoria Climbié

References

External links
  – all story in details
  – jury official summary

2012 in England
2012 murders in the United Kingdom
2013 in England
2010s in Coventry
Child abuse in England
Child abuse resulting in death
Deaths by person in England
History of Coventry
Incidents of violence against boys
March 2012 events in the United Kingdom
Murder in the West Midlands (county)
Social care in England
Trials in England